"The Party Ain't Over Yet" is a song written by John David and recorded by American country singer Patty Loveless for her 1997 album, Long Stretch of Lonesome. The song was later covered and released as a single by the British rock band Status Quo in 2005. It was included on the album of the same name.

Track listings 
CD single
 "The Party Ain't Over Yet" (Radio Mix) (David) - 3:36
 "I'm Watching Over You" (Rossi-Young) - 3:49

7-inch single
 "The Party Ain't Over Yet" (Album Version) (David) - 3:51
 "Gerdundula" (Live 2005) (Rossi-Young) - 6:45

Charts

References 

Patty Loveless songs
Status Quo (band) songs
1997 songs
2005 singles
Sanctuary Records singles
Songs written by John David (musician)
UK Independent Singles Chart number-one singles